Seileria is a monotypic moth genus in the subfamily Arctiinae. Its single species, Seileria eucyaniformis, is found in Colombia. Both the genus and species were first described by Paul Dognin in 1923.

References

Arctiinae